South Branch may refer to:

 South Branch, Minnesota, an unincorporated community in Watonwan County
 South Branch, New Jersey, an unincorporated community in Somerset County
 South Branch (New York), a stream in Herkimer County
 South Branch Newport Creek, a tributary of Newport Creek in Luzerne County, Pennsylvania
 South Branch Raritan River, a tributary of the Raritan River in New Jersey
 South Branch, New Brunswick, Canada
 South Branch, a Norfolk Southern Railway line

See also

 South Branch Township (disambiguation)